Nieuwenkamp is a Dutch surname. Notable people with the surname include:

 W. O. J. Nieuwenkamp (1874–1950), Dutch artist, writer, and ethnologist
 Willem Nieuwenkamp (1903–1979), Dutch geologist

Dutch-language surnames